Sina Asadbeigi (born July 17, 1997) is an Iranian football midfielder who currently plays for Persepolis in the Persian Gulf Pro League.

Club career

Paykan 
In the 2017–18 season, Asadbeigi joined Persian Gulf Pro League side Paykan.

Havadar 
In the 2019–20 season, Asadbeigi joined Azadegan League side Havadar. He played in 14 matches for Havadar.

Zob Ahan
He made his debut for Zob Ahan in 18th fixtures of 2020–21 Persian Gulf Pro League against Paykan while he substituted in for Ghasem Haddadifar.

Persepolis
On 27 July 2022, Asadbeigi joined Persian Gulf Pro League side Persepolis on a three-year deal.

Club career statistics

References

External links 

 Asadbeigi at persianleague.com

Living people
1997 births
Association football midfielders
Iranian footballers
Zob Ahan Esfahan F.C. players
Persian Gulf Pro League players
Persepolis F.C. players